Paraga in football is a popular expression in Greece that refers to the control of EPO (Hellenic Football Federation) by extra-institutional bodies, in the manipulation of matches by football players, selected Referee (football)  and generally throughout the illegal activity around organizing the  tournaments.

The wagon factor 
It is Antonis Mantzavelakis, an agent of the PAO, who has established the bribery of players and agents of rival teams since the establishment of the First National and with a suitcase

The case of flowers 
On May 28, 1975, the semi-final semi-final cup was held in Thessaloniki between Iraklis Thessaloniki and Panathinaikos

Giorgos Rokidis, a former player of Panathinaikos, complains that Panathinaikos, the well-known and non-outstanding general captain, Antonis Mantzavelakis, "approached" himself and his teammates to Heracles Zacharias Chaliambalias and Takis Nikoloudis.

The three players were punished by Hercules and were not used in the match. Hercules precedes 1-0 and loses 2-1 from Panathinaikos. Home goalkeepers Grigoris Fanaras ate a completely funny goal. Who Fanaras after the "flower affair", as bribery went through history, opened a florist in Thessaloniki!

The accused Panathinaikos cleaned up with the vote of former Olympic captain, Patriarch of Olympiacos, George Andrianopoulos, Mayor of Piraeus, Minister of Commercial Shipping and, of course, President of Olympiacos.
"I was not going to vote against Panathinaikos", he was confessed, not publicly, by lawyer George Andrianopoulos who ultimately assumed responsibility for the release of the eternal adversary.

Chalkidis case 
Wednesday, February 3, 1982. Heracles of Thessaloniki hosts the KAUF, in the first match of the two teams, during the 16th phase of the 1981-82 season. Before the game begins, Heracles denounces an attempt to bribe the player of Orphanides by the president of ... Kastoria Halkidis, so Orphanides has a reduced performance at the Hercules-PAO game.
 
There are cassettes for the disputed talks, which were also heard by journalists from Thessaloniki, at a press conference organized by the president of Heracles FC, Mr. Tertilinis. In these cassettes, Halkides of Kastoria is told to Orphanides of Hercules:
 
 Halkidis: "Vardinoyannis is a State. They do not understand anything. If you have a good deal with them, you have solved the problem of your life. I will get from them a loan of 230,000,000 drachmas. That's why I act. Let him take a goal and get 2,000,000 drachmas. Take these 200,000 drachmas (and he handed him 2 bundles of 100,000 drachmas sealed by the National Bank of Kastoria) and in the evening after the match if everything goes well we will meet in Chalcedon for the rest .
 Orphanides:  For the Second Game?  Halkidis: "There we do not need. We have the arbitration. And do not forget that Vardinoyannis is a State. Here we did the Indian (Bublis) Greek.

Paraga of Thomas 
The term is mostly associated with the championships of Olympiacos F.C. during the years 1997-2003 and its then president Sokratis Kokkalis, but has also spread to refer to the general corruption in the Greek football. According to the public opinion, the lure has always been the annual financial bonus from UEFA for the participating teams in the UEFA Champions League.

With the method of telephone tapping, Makis Triantafyllopoulos, a TV journalist, trapped a conversation between Thomas Mitropoulos (invisible owner of Egaleo F.C. and at the same time "advisor of Olympiakos on arbitration matters") and a referee (Spathas), saying "...only Olympiacos, only Olympiacos should win, nothing else, and Egaleo. Everybody else should go and fuck off..." and referring to Kokkalis as the Uncle. The journalist involved also the president then of the Hellenic Football Federation, Vassilis Gagatsis.

"Koriopolis"

After the taking of Olympiakos' leadership by Evangelos Marinakis, new scandals came in the light, such as the Koriopolis scandal. In one of the recorded conversations, Olympiacos Volou' chairman Achilleas Beos asks protection for the referees (Kalopoulos, Tryfonas) from Evangelos Marinakis, after a controversial winning game of Olympiakos against Panathinaikos on 21 February 2011. In February 2012, the Superleague Greece with the agreement of the Hellenic Football Federation achieved the replacement of the two football prosecutors (Fakos, Antonakakis) with two others (Petropoulos, Karras). The investigation had no progress.

Reactions and judicial process
In 1999, after a derby match between Olympiacos F.C. and A.E.K. Athens F.C., Demis Nikolaidis and other AEK players decided to abstain from the Greece national football team as a protest for the arbitration. They revoked in 2001 after the coming of Otto Rehhagel as manager.

In 2004, the ex-manager of Egaleo FC, Stéphane Demol, stated that the reason he was sacked from the team was because he didn't agree with the president on match-fixing.

In 2008, referee Dimitris Pontikis stated that indeed there was among the referees a group that favoured Olympiacos F.C., in exchange for a better career.

On 21 February 2011, after a controversial derby match between Olympiakos and Panathinaikos F.C. (referee Kalopoulos), Panathinaikos striker Djibril Cissé had an wrangle with Evangelos Marinakis and stated he would abandon Superleague Greece because of the arbitration.

With the break out of the Koriopolis scandal, appeals to the Greek Justice were made by some politicians, such as the ministers Yiannis Kourakis and Giorgos Floridis, who stated that "a gang controls the referees from the background". In 2011, minister Pavlos Geroulanos called the Greek football "totally corrupted". The whole judicial process had no result. At the time, UEFA officials said no action was presently being considered against Olympiakos regarding its participation in the Champions League of the following season.

"Criminal Organization"

In August 2014, new elements came in the light by the National Intelligence Service involving Marinakis, Giorgos Sarris (president of the Hellenic Football Federation) and other football officers, referees and judges in the establishment of a "criminal organisation". Also, Marinakis is appearing to be behind the attack to the bakery shop of Konstantineas and behind attacks to referees (Giorgos Daloukas, Dimitris Kyrkos etc.), journalists and others.

In September 2014, Olivier Kapo, ex-player of Levadiakos F.C., stated in French media that "in Greek football everything is corrupted, mafia-controlled, while FIFA and UEFA simply don't care".

In November 2014, the Chief Refereeing Officer Hugh Dallas criticized the arbitration of Ilias Spathas, after a match of Olympiacos, as the "worst he has ever seen" saying that the mistakes were not normal. A few days later he quit from being responsible for the appointments of refereeing officials for Super League and Football League matches.

In June 2015, ex-owner of Fostiras F.C., Carlo Vandekerkhof, stated: "the situation in Greece is a shame, the second division is a catastrophy...I was approached also to fix a match...seems to be in their culture".

 Paramount of sanitation 
With the inauguration of the government by SYRIZA and in cooperation with  Stavros Kontonis, the presidents of PAOK and AEK recruited a number of dark personalities of football. Achilles Beos, for example, was identified in Macedonia's Palace owned by Ivan Savvidi when some 35 representatives of the Union were gathered in the presence of both the owner of PAOK and the owner of AEK Dimitris Melissanidis.  I saw some friends, I came for another job,  Beos justifies. A few months later he traveled to Rostov, Russia, where Savvides' operations are based, as a representative of the Volos Municipality with which the Russian city is framed and last May hosted PAOK and AEK in Volos in a truly unforgettable Cup final.

Today, Mr. Mitropoulos appears next to Dimitris Melissanidis, for whom he allegedly has activated his contacts according to press reports in order to change the administration of EPO. As in Beau's case, neither the reappearance of Thomas in the forefront seems to bother.

The "redevelopment", which has been the major success of the instruments belonging to the wider Savvides business group, not only does not touch Thomas, but not even the president of the ET of that time, Vassilis Gagatsis, who even draws a series of criminals on his back, was found to run the Super League co-op, having been promoted naturally by PAOK.

Suddenly, Greek football was dismantled from yesterday's "bad guys" to end up in the hands of "bad" of yesterday, whose sins were purged in the backyard of the guided media army.

In a nutshell, the redevelopment of Ivan Savvidis  ours '' Vangelis Grammenos, is that of the throne of Thomas Mitropoulos, Achilles Beos and Vasilis Gagatsis.

See also 
 Koriopolis
 2015 Greek football scandal
 2006 Italian football scandal

References 

Association football controversies
Modern Greek words and phrases
Super League Greece
Football in Greece
1997 establishments in Greece
Corruption in Greece
Match fixing
Crime in Greece